Avocado cake is a cake prepared using avocado as a primary ingredient, together with other typical cake ingredients. The avocados may be used as an ingredient in batter or as a topping.

Overview

Avocado is a main ingredient in avocado cake, along with other typical cake ingredients. Many varieties of avocados can be used. Avocado cake may have a subtle avocado flavor imbued in the dish. Mashed avocado can be used as an ingredient in the batter and in cake frostings and toppings. Sliced avocado can be used to top or garnish it, as can other ingredients such as the zest of citrus fruits.

Additional ingredients used can include yogurt, buttermilk, raisins, dates, walnuts, hazelnuts, allspice, cinnamon and nutmeg among others. Lemon juice may be used on the avocado to prevent browning from occurring. Avocado cake can be prepared as a vegetarian and vegan dish. Chocolate cake and pancakes can be prepared with avocado as an ingredient in the batter.

Variations

Raw avocado cake
Avocado cake can be prepared as an uncooked cake using raw avocados and other raw ingredients, which are blended together into a smooth consistency and then chilled. A food processor can be used to blend the ingredients. Raw avocado cake prepared with a significant amount of avocado may contain substantial amounts of vitamin E and essential fatty acids, which are derived from avocado.

Avocado brownies
Avocado brownies are brownies prepared using avocado as a primary ingredient. The use of overripe avocados may contribute to the gooey, fudge-like consistency of the dish. Black beans can be used in the dish, and can be used in the place of flour.

Avocado cheesecake
Avocado cheesecake is a style of cheesecake prepared using avocado as a main ingredient. Raw avocados may be used in its preparation, and it may have a creamy texture and consistency. Avocado cheesecake was featured in an episode of the television show MasterChef in March 2015.

Avocado-based cake toppings
Avocado cakes can be topped with an avocado-based fool. A fool is a pressed fruit mixture or fruit purée that is mixed with cream or custard. The term "fool" in this context dates to the 16th century, and was also a synonym for "a trifling thing of small consequence."

Some milk sponge cakes can be topped with avocado crazy, a food in Sri Lankan cuisine. Avocado crazy can be prepared with avocado, cream, sugar and lemon juice. Rum may also be added. Avocado crazy may have a creamy texture and flavor.

See also

 Avocado toast
 List of avocado dishes
 List of cakes

Notes

References

Further reading

External links

 Avocado pound cake. Epicurious.
 Dark chocolate avocado brownies. Epicurious.
 Avocado Cheesecake with Walnut Crust. Allrecipes.com.

Cakes
Avocado dishes